Mariyam Ashfa (born 25 December 1982) is a Maldivian singer and actress.

Career
Since a very early age, Ashfa participated in Interschool Singing Competition where she received several accolades for the same. She made her career debut with the song "Dhan Dhan Dhan" from the album Rovvaanulaa (2006). A duet with Mohamed Abdul Ghanee, the song topped several charts upon release and her talent was recognized by the music composers. Even though "Dhan Dhan Dhan" was released earlier, her first recorded song was "Vindhaa Hithaa Jaanaa", another duet with Ghanee. Soon after, she rendered several songs and became a prominent name in the industry. Ashfa received her first Gaumee Film Award nomination for Best Female Playback Singer with the song "Niuma" from the film Niuma (2010). The "pain" and "emotion" in her rendition were praised by the music critics.

Apart from singing, Ashfa received several offers for acting performances which she rejected citing lack of "self confidence" during the time. However, considering the "well-wishes" from her family and friends, she accepted a film offer from director Ravee Farooq, in which the project was halted in pre-production due to several issues. Later on, Dark Rain Entertainment offered her a project titled Beeveemaa which is scheduled to release in 2021.

Discography

Feature Film

Short films

Television

Non-Film songs

Religious/Madhaha

Filmography

Accolades

References 

Living people
People from Malé
1982 births
Maldivian playback singers